Las Tablas may refer to:
 Las Tablas, Los Santos, Panama
 Las Tablas, Bocas del Toro, Panama
 Las Tablas District, Panama
 Las Tablas in Jerez de la Frontera, Cadiz Province, Spain
Las Tablas (Madrid Metro), a station on Line 10 and ML-1